Events in the year 1666 in Norway.

Incumbents
Monarch: Frederick III

Events
12 January - All the crown estates in Helgeland, Salten, Lofoten, Vesterålen, Andenes, Senja and Troms was given to Joachim Irgens von Westervick.
Ulrik Fredrik Gyldenløve was appointed commander-in-chief of the Norwegian army.

Arts and literature

Births

28 November – Magnus Berg, woodcarver, sculptor, painter (died 1739).

Deaths

See also

References